Martin Dominic Martin Hassan (born 16 September 1999) is a South Sudanese footballer who plays as a midfielder for South Korean club Ulsan Citizen FC and the South Sudan national team.

Club career
Sawi began his career at South Sudanese club Young Stars, before moving to South Korea in 2016 to sign for Ansan Greeners. In 2018, Sawi signed for Goyang Citizen. In January 2020, after scoring 19 goals in 35 appearances for Goyang, Sawi signed for K3 League club Yangju Citizen.

International career
In November 2018, Sawi made an appearance for South Sudan's under-23 team against Uganda at Juba Stadium. On 17 November 2019, Sawi made his debut for South Sudan in a 2–1 loss against Burkina Faso.

References

External links
 

1999 births
Living people
People with acquired South Sudanese citizenship
South Sudanese footballers
South Sudan international footballers
Association football midfielders
South Sudanese expatriate footballers
South Sudanese expatriate sportspeople in South Korea
Expatriate footballers in South Korea
K3 League players
Sportspeople from Alexandria